Floyd County is a county located in the U.S. state of Iowa. As of the 2020 census, the population was 15,627. The county seat is Charles City.

History
Floyd County was established in 1854 and was named for Sergeant Charles Floyd of the Lewis and Clark Expedition, who died in 1804 near what is now Sioux City, Iowa, and who was the only member to die on the Expedition.

The first school in the county was taught at Nora Springs in 1854. The second was opened at Charles City, the third at Floyd. Twelve years later there were 54 schools in the county, in September 1875, there were 100 school-houses in Floyd County.

Geography

Major highways
 U.S. Highway 18
 U.S. Highway 218
 Iowa Highway 14
 Iowa Highway 27

Adjacent counties
Mitchell County  (north)
Chickasaw County  (east)
Butler County  (south)
Cerro Gordo County  (west)
Howard County  (northeast)
Bremer County  (southeast)
Franklin County  (southwest)

Demographics

2020 census
There were 7,314 housing units of which 6,674 were occupied.

2010 census
There were 7,526 housing units, of which 6,886 were occupied.

2000 census

As of the census of 2000, there were 16,900 people, 6,828 households, and 4,711 families residing in the county.  The population density was 34 people per square mile (13/km2).  There were 7,317 housing units at an average density of 15 per square mile (6/km2).  The racial makeup of the county was 98.11% White, 0.23% Black or African American, 0.09% Native American, 0.43% Asian, 0.09% Pacific Islander, 0.44% from other races, and 0.60% from two or more races.  1.31% of the population were Hispanic or Latino of any race.

There were 6,828 households, out of which 30.50% had children under the age of 18 living with them, 57.70% were married couples living together, 7.70% had a female householder with no husband present, and 31.00% were non-families. 28.00% of all households were made up of individuals, and 14.60% had someone living alone who was 65 years of age or older.  The average household size was 2.40 and the average family size was 2.92.

In the county, the population was spread out, with 25.10% under the age of 18, 7.00% from 18 to 24, 24.40% from 25 to 44, 24.20% from 45 to 64, and 19.20% who were 65 years of age or older.  The median age was 40 years. For every 100 females there were 93.50 males.  For every 100 females age 18 and over, there were 90.40 males.

The median income for a household in the county was $35,237, and the median income for a family was $41,133. Males had a median income of $30,285 versus $20,867 for females. The per capita income for the county was $17,091.  About 6.50% of families and 9.30% of the population were below the poverty line, including 13.00% of those under age 18 and 5.70% of those age 65 or over.

Communities

Cities

Charles City
Colwell
Floyd
Marble Rock
Nora Springs
Rockford
Rudd

Unincorporated communities
 Midway
 Powersville
 Roseville (a census-designated place)

Townships
Floyd County is divided into twelve townships:

 Cedar
 Floyd
 Niles
 Pleasant Grove
 Riverton
 Rock Grove
 Rockford
 Rudd
 Saint Charles
 Scott
 Ulster
 Union

Population ranking
The population ranking of the following table is based on the 2020 census of Floyd County.

† county seat

Politics
Prior to 1988, Floyd County was strongly Republican in presidential elections. In only four elections from 1896 to 1984 did a Republican presidential candidate fail to win the county. Starting with the 1988 election, the county consistently backed Democratic Party presidential candidates up until the 2012 election. In the presidential election of 2016, the county swung 29.5 points Republican with Donald Trump winning the county by over 14 points after Barack Obama won the county by a similar margin 4 years earlier.

See also

National Register of Historic Places listings in Floyd County, Iowa
Parks in Floyd County, Iowa
The Floyd County Court House, completed in 1940, is listed on the National Register of Historic Places.

References

External links
 
Official Floyd County website
Floyd County Museum

 
1851 establishments in Iowa
Populated places established in 1851